The Kronfeld Monoplane was a 1930s British ultra-light aircraft designed by Robert Kronfeld, only one was built.

Design and development
Designed as a successor to the company's Kronfeld Drone, the Monoplane was a single-seat parasol monoplane powered by a  Carden-Ford converted car engine. The Monoplane, registered G-AESG, was built and first flown at Hanworth Aerodrome in 1937. With the start of the Second World War a second unfinished Monoplane and the prototype were scrapped.

Specifications

See also

References

Notes

Bibliography

1930s British sport aircraft
Parasol-wing aircraft
Aircraft first flown in 1937
Single-engined pusher aircraft